Palaiomanina is an Aromanian (Vlach) village and a community of the Xiromero municipality. Since the 2011 local government reform it was part of the municipality Astakos, of which it was a municipal district. The 2011 census recorded 754 residents in the village. The community of Palaiomanina covers an area of 26.82 km2.

See also
 List of settlements in Aetolia-Acarnania

References

Populated places in Aetolia-Acarnania
Aromanian settlements in Greece